Charles Henry Gaudion (14 April 1904 – 24 September 1979) was an Australian rules footballer who played with Footscray and North Melbourne in the Victorian Football League (VFL).

Family
The son of John Richard Gaudion (1878-1914), and Margaret Robina Parkhill Gaudion (1884-1964), née Cunningham, Charles Henry Gaudion was born at Footscray on 14 April 1904.

He married Mary Monica Agnes "Molly" Kelly (1912-1961), in Footscray, on 22 July 1933. He was the father of North Melbourne player Michael Gaudion (1938-2021) and VFL umpire Charles Joseph "Barry" Gaudion, the brother of Yarraville, North Melbourne, Geelong, and Coburg footballer John Donald "Jack" Gaudion (1910-1993), and the nephew of Collingwood footballer Francis Charles "Frank" Gaudion (1882-1952).

Football

Footscray (VFL)
Gaudion was a key position player and began his career in 1926 at Footscray.

Coburg (VFA)
He played with the club for four seasons before moving to the Victorian Football Association (VFA) where he signed with Coburg.

North Melbourne (VFL)
After just a year at Coburg he returned to the league and played with North Melbourne, becoming a regular in their side during the 1930s.

Interstate football
He was also a regular for Victoria at interstate football, playing every year from 1932 to 1936, the last as captain.

West Adelaide (SANFL)
In 1940 he was captain-coach of West Adelaide.

Coach
In both 1956 and 1957 he coached North Melbourne, many of those games involving his son Michael.

VFL Tribunal
In the 1960s he served as players' advocate at the VFL Tribunal.

Death
He died at the Marshall Park Nursing Home in the Perth suburb of Midland on 24 September 1979.

See also
 1927 Melbourne Carnival

Footnotes

References
 World War Two Nominal Roll: Lieutenant Charles Henry Gaudion (452/SX10555), Department of Veterans' Affairs.

External links
 
 
 Charles Gaudion, at The VFA Project.

1904 births
1979 deaths
Australian rules footballers from Melbourne
Western Bulldogs players
Coburg Football Club players
North Melbourne Football Club players
North Melbourne Football Club coaches
West Adelaide Football Club coaches
People from Footscray, Victoria